Shape is the second studio album from Australian band Frente!, released in July 1996.  The album was recorded in Spain in 1995 and produced by Cameron McVey and Ted Niceley. It was not as successful as their debut album.

Critical reception
Billboard wrote that the band "breaks new creative ground without straying too far from its quirky style."

Track listing
All songs written by Angie Hart and Simon Austin, except where noted.
"Sit on My Hands" (Hart) - 4:00
"Horrible" - 1:52
"Goodbye Goodguy" (Austin, Hart, Bill McDonald) - 2:51
"Burning Girl" - 2:36
"Clue" - 2:24
"Harm" - 3:54
"Air" (Austin, Hart, McDonald) - 4:23
"Jungle" (Austin, Hart, McDonald, Alastair Barden) - 3:06
"So Mad" (Hart) - 2:28
"Safe from You" - 4:21
"The Destroyer" - 2:33
"What's Come Over Me" (Hart) - 4:52
"Calmly" - 8:59
"Bill's O Bubblin" (Japan only bonus track)
"Dub on My Hands" (Japan only bonus track)

Weekly charts

Personnel
Angie Hart - lead vocals
Simon Austin - guitar and backing vocals
 Bill McDonald - bass guitar 
 Alastair Barden - drums

References

Frente! albums
1996 albums
Albums produced by Cameron McVey
Albums produced by Ted Niceley
Albums produced by David M. Allen